Brandon Arnell Ganuelas-Rosser (born June 29, 1994) is a Filipino-American basketball player for the NLEX Road Warriors of the Philippine Basketball Association (PBA).

Professional career

Blackwater Bossing (2022)
Ganuelas-Rosser was drafted first overall in the 2022 PBA draft.

NLEX Road Warriors (2022–present)
On September 19, 2022, Ganuelas-Rosser was traded to the NLEX Road Warriors in a three-team trade involving NLEX, Blackwater, and TNT Tropang Giga.

PBA career statistics

As of the end of 2022–23 season

Season-by-season averages
 
|-
| align=left rowspan=2| 
| align=left | Blackwater
| rowspan=2|32 || rowspan=2|27.0 || rowspan=2|.498 || rowspan=2|.274 || rowspan=2|.643 || rowspan=2|5.7 || rowspan=2|1.0 || rowspan=2|.7 || rowspan=2|1.5 || rowspan=2|12.6
|-
| align=left | NLEX
|-class=sortbottom
| align=center colspan=2 | Career
| 32 || 27.0 || .498 || .274 || .643 || 5.7 || 1.0 || .7 || 1.5 || 12.6

3x3 career
Rosser played for the Limitless Appmasters of the PBA 3x3.

Personal life
Ganuelas-Rosser was born to James Rosser, a retired US Navy, and Gina Ganuelas. He has an older brother, Matt, who also plays in the PBA.

References

External links 
 PBA.ph profile

1994 births
Living people
American men's 3x3 basketball players
American men's basketball players
American sportspeople of Filipino descent
Basketball players from San Diego
Blackwater Bossing draft picks
Blackwater Bossing players
Centers (basketball)
Citizens of the Philippines through descent
Competitors at the 2021 Southeast Asian Games
Filipino men's 3x3 basketball players
Filipino men's basketball players
NLEX Road Warriors players
PBA 3x3 players
Power forwards (basketball)
San Miguel Alab Pilipinas players
Southeast Asian Games bronze medalists for the Philippines
Southeast Asian Games medalists in 3x3 basketball
UC Riverside Highlanders men's basketball players